Stephan Flauder (born 30 May 1986) is a German footballer who plays as a goalkeeper.

Career
Flauder began his career with Erzgebirge Aue and was promoted to the first team in 2008, making his debut on the last day of the 2007–08 season in a 1–1 draw with 1860 Munich with Aue already relegated from the 2. Bundesliga. Since then he has served as understudy to Martin Männel, as the club returned to the second tier in 2010.

He left Aue in 2013 to sign for BFC Dynamo. In his first season with BFC, coached by Volkan Uluc, he played the DFB-Pokal match against VfB Stuttgart, narrowly lost 2–0 in Friedrich-Ludwig-Jahn-Sportpark and secured the wine-reds' promotion to Regionalliga in 2014.

References

External links

1986 births
Living people
German footballers
Association football goalkeepers
FC Erzgebirge Aue players
Berliner FC Dynamo players
FC Viktoria 1889 Berlin players
Kickers Offenbach players
2. Bundesliga players
3. Liga players
Regionalliga players
Sportspeople from Frankfurt (Oder)
Footballers from Brandenburg